Sefanaia Sukanaivalu VC (1 January 1918 – 23 June 1944) was a Fijian soldier and a posthumous recipient of the Victoria Cross, the highest and most prestigious award for gallantry in the face of the enemy that can be awarded to Commonwealth forces. He is the only Fijian to be awarded the VC.

Biography
Sukanaivalu was born on Yacata, Fiji, on 1 January 1918 and joined the Fiji Infantry Regiment during World War II. By mid-1944, he was a corporal in the 3rd Battalion, which was taking part in the Bougainville campaign. He died under Japanese fire on 23 June 1944, at Mawaraka, during an attempt to rescue comrades, in circumstances which led to his being awarded the Victoria Cross.

The citation reads:

His body was eventually recovered by Australian forces assisted by members of the Fijian 1st Docks Company. Sukanaivalu was buried at Rabaul (Bita Paka) War Cemetery, New Britain, Papua New Guinea. In 2005, it was announced that there were plans to repatriate Sukanaivalu's remains to Fiji.

References
Notes

Bibliography
Monuments to Courage (David Harvey, 1999)
The Register of the Victoria Cross (This England, 1997)

1918 births
1944 deaths
People from Yacata
Fijian soldiers
Fijian World War II recipients of the Victoria Cross
Fijian military personnel killed in World War II
I-Taukei Fijian people
Deaths by firearm